A gubernatorial election was held on 7 April 2019 to elect the next governor of Fukuoka.

Candidates 
Hirochi Ogawa* back by the local LDP, Komeito.
Kazuhisa Takeuchi, back by the national LDP.
Kiyoshi Shinoda, back by the JCP.

Results

References 

2019 elections in Japan
Gubernatorial elections in Japan
April 2019 events in Japan
Politics of Fukuoka Prefecture